Stanislav Naumov (born 4 October 1972, Magnitogorsk, Chelyabinsk Oblast) is a Russian political figure and a deputy of the 8th State Duma.
 
From 1992 to 1997, Naumov worked as a press secretary of the mayor of Magnitogorsk. From 1997 to 1998, he was an advisor to Alexander Pochinok. From 1998 to 1999, he was Vice-Rector of the International banking Institute. From 1999 to 2004, he was an advisor to Russian politician and the chairman of the board of the Eurasian Economic Commission Viktor Khristenko. From 2010 to 2020, he was the president of the Russian Association for Public Relations. From 2010 to 2017, he was the Head of the Department of Philosophy at the National Research Nuclear University MEPhI (Moscow Engineering Physics Institute). In March 2015, Naumov became the Director for Government Relations at X5 Retail Group. In 2021, he joined the Liberal Democratic Party of Russia. Since September 2021, he has served as deputy of the 8th State Duma.

References
 

 

1972 births
Living people
Liberal Democratic Party of Russia politicians
21st-century Russian politicians
Eighth convocation members of the State Duma (Russian Federation)
Seventh convocation members of the State Duma (Russian Federation)
Sixth convocation members of the State Duma (Russian Federation)
Fifth convocation members of the State Duma (Russian Federation)
People from Magnitogorsk